Theobald Otjen (October 27, 1851 – April 11, 1924) was a U.S. Representative from Wisconsin.

Theobald was born to German immigrants John Conrad and Dorothea (Schreiner) Otjen, in west China township in St. Clair County, Michigan and attended the Marine City (Michigan) Academy and a private school in Detroit. He was employed as foreman in the rolling mill of the Milwaukee Iron Co. in Milwaukee 1870–1872. He graduated from the law department of the University of Michigan at Ann Arbor on March 25, 1875. He was admitted to the bar at Ann Arbor in 1875 and commenced practice in Detroit, Michigan. He moved to Milwaukee, Wisconsin, in 1883. He served as member of the common council of Milwaukee 1887–1894. Otjen also served as a trustee of the Milwaukee Public Library 1887–1891, and a trustee of the public museum 1891–1894. He was an unsuccessful candidate for comptroller of the city in April 1892. He was an unsuccessful candidate for election in 1892 to the 53rd Congress and in 1893 to the same Congress to fill the vacancy caused by the resignation of John L. Mitchell.

Otjen was eventually elected as a Republican to the 54th and to the five succeeding Congresses (March 4, 1895 – March 3, 1907) as the representative of Wisconsin's 4th congressional district. He was an unsuccessful candidate for renomination in 1906. He resumed the practice of law in Milwaukee, Wisconsin.

Theobald married Louisa Elizabeth Heames, daughter of prominent Detroit civil engineer Henry Heames, in Detroit on March 27, 1879, and had five children between 1880 and 1892. He died in Milwaukee, Wisconsin, April 11, 1924. He was interred in Forest Home Cemetery.

External links

1851 births
1924 deaths
People from St. Clair County, Michigan
Wisconsin city council members
Michigan Republicans
University of Michigan Law School alumni
Republican Party members of the United States House of Representatives from Wisconsin